Spectrum Health Lakeland is a nonprofit community-owned health system in southwest Michigan. The health system comprises three hospitals, an outpatient surgery center, a regional cancer center, rehabilitation centers, two long-term care residences, home care and hospice services, and 34 affiliate physician practice locations. More than 470 primary and specialty care physicians and other licensed providers practice medicine at Lakeland Health, which makes the system Berrien County's largest employer.

History

For over a century, Spectrum Health Lakeland has served the community of southwest Michigan. Since its inception, the health system has experienced mergers, consolidations, and growth.

 1899 - Mercy Hospital opens in Benton Harbor (building demolished beginning November 7, 2016)
 1951 - Memorial Hospital opens in St. Joseph
 1977 - Memorial Hospital (St. Joseph) and Mercy Hospital (Benton Harbor) merge to form Mercy Memorial Hospital
 1992 - Pawating Hospital (Niles) merges with Mercy Memorial Hospital, forming Lakeland Regional Health System; Pawating Hospital becomes Lakeland Hospital, Niles
 1994 - Berrien General Hospital merges with Lakeland
 2002 - Center for Outpatient Services opens in Royalton Township, St. Joseph
 2009 - Inpatient addition opens at Lakeland Regional Medical Center, St. Joseph
 2010 - Southwestern Medical Clinic becomes a Lakeland HealthCare Affiliate; Community Hospital of Watervliet merges with Lakeland
 2011 - The Marie Yeager Cancer Center in Royalton Township opens; Hospice at Home becomes a Lakeland HealthCare Affiliate
 2012 - Lakeland Medical Suites, Niles opens to the public
 2013 - The new and expanded Emergency Department opens at Lakeland Hospital, Niles; Hanson Hospice Center opens to the public; Pine Ridge Nursing and Rehabilitation opens to the public
 2015 - Lakeland HealthCare announces corporate name change to Lakeland Health
 2015 - Lakeland Health joins Mary Free Bed Rehabilitation Network
 2015 - Six Michigan health systems align to form integrated care network
 2016 - Lakeland Board of Directors approve five-story, $160 million expansion to St. Joseph campus
 2018 - Lakeland Health and Spectrum Health announce a possible merger to be determined by October 2018; merger proceeded

Services 
Spectrum Health Lakeland provides both inpatient and outpatient medical services throughout southwest Michigan. Lakeland Hospital, Niles and Lakeland Medical Center, St. Joseph are two of 14 hospitals in Michigan accredited by the Society of Chest Pain Centers. The Joint Commission, in conjunction with The American Heart Association/American Stroke Association, has recognized Lakeland Medical Center, St. Joseph and Lakeland Hospital, Niles with Advanced Certification for Primary Stroke Centers.

Campuses 
 Lakeland Medical Center, St. Joseph
 Lakeland Hospital, Niles
 Lakeland Hospital, Watervliet
 The Lakeland Health Park, St. Joseph
 The Hanson Care Park

Donations 

In 2013, Lakeland Health, as it was known then, provided a total of $22.1 million in community benefits to improve quality of life in southwest Michigan:
 $15.5 million in financial assistance and subsidized care
 $3.6 million in medical education 
 $2.7 million in community outreach and leadership 
 $.21 million in cash and in-kind donations

Awards 
 2014 Advisory Board Engagement Award
 2014 HIMSS Enterprise Davies Award recipient
 2014 Governor's Fitness Award Outstanding Healthy Workplace Diamond Level Winner
 2014 Governor's Award of Excellence for outstanding inpatient clinical achievement in the acute care hospital setting
 2015 "100 Great Community Hospitals" by Becker's Hospital Review
 2015 Most Wired List
 2015 Patient Centric Imaging Award
 Healthgrades Patient Safety Excellence Award
 Stage 7 by HIMSS Analytics
 U.S. News & World Report 2016 Best Hospitals List
 2017 15 Top Health System by Truven Health Analytics

References

External links 
 

Hospitals in Michigan